Saint-Amour-Bellevue is a commune in the Saône-et-Loire department in the region of Bourgogne-Franche-Comté in eastern France.

Twin cities
 Durbuy  (Belgium)

See also
Communes of the Saône-et-Loire department

References

Communes of Saône-et-Loire